Asylum of the Human Predator is Hell Within's first studio album.

The first single off the album was "Bleeding Me Black". An accompanying music video was produced by Ian McFarland of Killswitch Productions. The video features the band playing in a warehouse, interspersed with shots of a young man who discovers his girlfriend is cheating on him. At the end of the video, the young man ties up his girlfriend's new boyfriend, and lights him on fire.

On July 22, 2005, the opening track from Asylum of the Human Predator, "Godspeed to Your Deathbed", reached #1 on the Comcast Music Choice network, beating out such bands as Nevermore, As I Lay Dying and A Life Once Lost.

First print editions of Asylum of the Human Predator contained a DVD of behind-the-scenes video of the band on tour. These have sold out and are now sought after by collectors.

Track listing
 "Godspeed to Your Deathbed"
 "Bleeding Me Black"
 "Redemption... Is a Cold Body"
 "Merchants of the Blood Trade"
 "A World to Murder"
 "Self-Inflicted Silence"
 "Asylum of the Human Predator"
 "Soul Revulsion"
 "Swallow the Stitches"
 "Open Eyes to Open Wounds"

External links
Official Website
Hell Within on MySpace
Lifeforce Records

Sources

2005 albums
Lifeforce Records albums